Funky Flashman is a fictional character, an entrepreneur in the DC Universe. Created by Jack Kirby, the character first appeared in the pages of Mister Miracle during the early 1970s. He is popularly considered a satiric caricature of Stan Lee, Kirby's former artistic collaborator at Marvel Comics with whom he had a falling-out. Flashman's attempts to rip off Mister Miracle reflect Kirby's view that Lee exploited his work at Marvel in the 1960s.

Fictional character biography
Nothing is known about Funky's past except that he and his sidekick Houseroy (popularly considered to be a caricature of Roy Thomas) were business associates of a Colonel Mockingbird. After Mockingbird's death, Funky and Houseroy lived on monthly allowances (most likely their inheritance from Mockingbird) that were automatically doled out. Noticing that the monthly allowances were getting smaller, Funky decided that he needed a new source of income.

In Funky Flashman's first appearance, he unsuccessfully attempts to cash in on the talents of Mister Miracle. Donning a wig and a beard, he meets with Mr. Miracle to interview for the position of his tour manager. Miracle accepts, despite the fact that Big Barda and Oberon object to Flashman's demeanor and tactics. The next day, Mr. Miracle performs several of his escape acts, much to Flashman's delight. Flashman asks for Miracle's secret, and Miracle reveals the Mother Box he keeps on his shoulder. From around the corner, the two men see Big Barda and the Female Fury Lashina engaged in a struggle. Miracle jumps in to help Barda but Lashina vanishes with the power of her phasing circuits. The two realize the Female Furies have been tracking their whereabouts through the Mother Box signal.

During the skirmish, Flashman decides to leave with the Mother Box in hand. He takes it back to his residence but cannot make heads or tails of it. He discards the box and decides the gift of Mr. Miracle is too risky. Mother Box begins to let out an "eeeeee" sound which summons all the Female Furies of Apokolips. Funky cowardly tosses his assistant at the attackers and jumps out the window. His inherited house explodes behind him, and Funky Flashman walks off to live another day.

Funky Flashman was later seen as a member of Darkseid's Secret Society of Super Villains.

Funky is later featured in many issues of Mister Miracle's own series. Tying into events in Justice League International, Funky forces Mister Miracle (AKA Scott Free) into an interstellar promotional campaign for the cleaning product Miracle Mister. This tour ends up involving Manga Khan and the forces of Apokolips, both dangerous threats. Mister Miracle is forced to leave behind a robotic double, so as to go on Funky's trip. The robot is destroyed in Rockefeller Center, leading many to believe Scott Free himself had died.

Flashman appears for two pages in Swamp Thing #76, "L'adoration De La terre" (September 1988), then part of Spontaneous Generation Bound Compilation #8, pp. 134 & 135, and later as the leader of the Secret Society of Super Villains in their series.

He appeared in 2005's Son of Vulcan mini-series as the proprietor of a pawn shop that dealt in superhero and villain artifacts and equipment, and as a criminal go-between and procurer for a White Martian named A'monn A'mokk.

He briefly appears in 2007's Doctor 13 limited series Architecture & Morality. He is seen operating Flashman Pre-Owned Auto, selling various superhero themed vehicles.

He appears in Adventure Comics, where he is apprehended by Red Robin and Superboy while driving through the streets of Paris with a stolen Mother Box.

Powers and abilities
Funky Flashman has no superhuman powers, but he is very charismatic, charming and a skilled businessman.

References

External links
 Funky Flashman at the Comic Book DB

Comics characters introduced in 1972
Characters created by Jack Kirby
DC Comics supervillains
Fictional businesspeople
Superman characters